KMXS is a commercial hot adult contemporary music radio station in Anchorage, Alaska, broadcasting on 103.1 FM.  Owned by Alpha Media LLC, its studios are located in Anchorage (two blocks west of Dimond Center), and its transmitter is in the North Star neighborhood. The station unveiled a new logo and positioner in 2020.

Previous logo

External links

1988 establishments in Alaska
Alpha Media radio stations
Hot adult contemporary radio stations in the United States
Radio stations established in 1988
MXS